Immanuel College is a private co-educational Jewish day school in Bushey, Hertfordshire, on the outskirts of North London. It is a member of the Headmasters' and Headmistresses' Conference.

The Immanuel College Preparatory School opened in autumn 2011 with a Reception class.

Founding and aims 

Immanuel College (formally named The Charles Kalms – Henry Ronson Immanuel College) was founded by Lord Jakobovits in 1990. His vision was of an educational establishment that would affirm Orthodox Jewish values and provide secular education. The college aims to create in pupils "an integrated personality whose Jewish identity is knowledgeable, secure and proud, as a spur to achievement and responsibility, and as a challenge to exemplary citizenship in a pluralist society".

A report by The Sutton Trust placed Immanuel College in the top 2% of schools nationally in terms of its students' success in gaining admission to the 13 most competitive research universities.

Grounds and facilities 

The school is situated on the 11-acre grounds of Caldecote Towers, adjacent to a Dominican convent, and on the former site of the Rosary Priory Catholic girls' school.

Curriculum 

The school offers public examinations in Years 10 and 11 (GCSE and the International GCSE) and in the Sixth Form (AS and A Level and International A levels).

Footnotes

External links 
 
 www.hmc.org.uk
 www.shmis.org.uk

Private schools in Hertfordshire
Member schools of the Headmasters' and Headmistresses' Conference
Jewish schools in England